The River Hor is a short river in the county of Norfolk, England.

History
The name of the river is probably a back-formation from the name of villages that it flows through. The village of Horsford has a name meaning "ford that horses can cross", so the river's name may be formed from that.

References

Hor